Rugby Nice Côte d'Azur Université-Racing was a French rugby union club, which went into liquidation in June 2012. Nice was founded in 1912, as Racing Rugby Club de Nice. Nice was runner-up in the national championship in the 1982-83 season. In 1985 Nice won the Challenge Yves du Manoir. Its successor is the new club, Stade Niçois.

Honours
French championship:
 Runners-up: 1983
 Challenge Yves du Manoir: 
 Champions: 1985
 Challenge de l'Espérance:
 Champions: 1974,1976

Finals results

French championship

Challenge Yves du Manoir

See also
 List of rugby union clubs in France

References 

Nice
Sport in Nice
1912 establishments in France
Rugby clubs established in 1912
Sports clubs disestablished in 2012
2012 disestablishments in France